O Anjo da Noite (English: The Angel of the Night) is a 1974 Brazilian film directed by Walter Hugo Khouri  and starring Selma Egrei and Eliezer Gomes.

Cast 

Selma Egrei as Ana
Eliezer Gomes as Augusto
Lilian Lemmertz as Raquel
Pedro Coelho as Marcelo
Rejane Saliamis as Carolina
Isabel Montes as Beatriz
Fernando Amaral as Rodrigo
Waldomiro Reis

Awards 
Gramado Film Festival 
Best Director (won)
Best Actor (won)
Best Cinematography (won)
Best Film (nominee)

São Paulo Association of Art Critics Awards
Best Film (won)
Best Music (won)

References

External links 
 

1974 films
1970s Portuguese-language films
Brazilian drama films
Films directed by Walter Hugo Khouri
Best Picture APCA Award winners
1974 drama films